Asthamanam is a 2012 Indian Tamil-language thriller film directed by Bandi Saroj Kumar and starring six newcomers.

Cast 
The film features six newcomers (Rajesh, Rajesh Kanagasabai, Victoria, Vidya, Sharan, Raghu) who play friends, and Munnar Ramesh plays their guide.

Production 
The film is based on a nightmare that the director had. This is Kumar's second film after Porkkalam (2010) and features no songs.

Reception 
A critic from The Times of India wrote that "In his sophomore effort, Saroj displays the same visual bravado that characterized his debut film. In fact, characters are bludgeoned to death with an instrument that seems to have been borrowed from the props of his previous film". A critic from Behindwoods stated that "The performance of the all the artists are sub-par. The dialogues sound completely vague and the dialogue deliverance is another matter of annoyance altogether". On the contrary, a critic from The New Indian Express opined that "At just a crisp 90 minutes of viewing time, 'Asthamanam' is an experiment worth a watch".

Box office 
The film had a below average box office run in Chennai.

References